International Falls (sometimes referred to as I-Falls) is a city in and the county seat of Koochiching County, Minnesota. The population was 5,802 at the time of the 2020 census.

International Falls is located on the Rainy River directly across from Fort Frances, Ontario, Canada. The two cities are connected by the Fort Frances–International Falls International Bridge. Voyageurs National Park is located 11 miles east of International Falls. There is a major U.S. Customs and Border Protection Port of Entry on the International Falls side of the toll bridge and a Canadian Customs entry point on the north side of the bridge.

International Falls is nicknamed the "Icebox of the Nation,” with an average of 109.4 days per year with a high temperature below .

History
The area now known as International Falls was inhabited by many indigenous peoples. The International Falls area was well known to explorers, missionaries, and voyagers as early as the 17th century. It was not until April 1895 that the community was platted by L. A. Ogaard, a teacher and preacher for the Koochiching Company, and named Koochiching. The word “Koochiching” comes from either the Ojibwe word Gojijiing or the Cree Kocicīhk, both meaning “at the place of inlets,” referring to the neighboring Rainy Lake and River. The European inhabitants gave the names Rainy Lake and Rainy River to the nearby bodies of water because of the mist-like rain present at the falls where the lake flowed into the river.

On August 10, 1901, the village was incorporated and two years later its name was changed to International Falls in recognition of the river's role as a border between the United States and Canada. It was incorporated as a city in 1909.

Realizing the potential for water power and mills in the area, industrialist E.W. Backus, president of the Minnesota and Ontario Paper Company in the early 20th century, built a dam on the Rainy River to power the company's mills. Purchased by Boise Cascade Corporation in 1965, and sold to an investment group in 2003, the company remains the largest business and employer in the area. In 2013 Boise laid off 394 employees and closed down a paper machine. It then sold to Packaging Corporation of America (PCA).

Geography

Climate
International Falls, with its relatively central position in the North American continent, has a humid continental climate (Köppen: Dfb), with long, bitterly cold winters and humid warm summers, and is part of USDA Plant hardiness zone 3a. January averages , and lows reach  on an average of 57.2 nights annually. Highs only reach the freezing point or above an average of 16.7 days in the months of December, January, and February, and the temperature often stays below freezing for weeks at a time during the winter. In the winter of 1978 to 1979, the temperature stayed below freezing for 101 days, from November 17 to February 25. Spring, and more especially autumn, are short but mild transition seasons. July averages , with highs reaching  an average of only 2 days annually, and in close to 40% of years, the temperature does not rise that high. The average window for freezing temperatures is September 14 through May 26, allowing a frost-free period of 110 days; however, the all-time record for the latest first freeze was set relatively recently on October 17, 2021, being over a month late. Measurable snowfall (≥) arrives on average on October 18 and departs April 22.

Icebox of the Nation
International Falls has long promoted itself as the "Icebox of the Nation"; however, the trademark for the slogan has been challenged on several occasions by the small town of Fraser, Colorado. Officials from Fraser claimed usage since 1956, International Falls since 1948. The two towns came to an agreement in 1986, when International Falls paid Fraser $2,000 to relinquish its "official" claim. However, in 1996, International Falls inadvertently failed to renew its federal trademark, although it had kept its state trademark up to date. Fraser then filed to gain the federal trademark. International Falls submitted photographic proof that its 1955 Pee Wee hockey team traveled to Boston, Massachusetts with the slogan. After several years of legal battles, the United States Patent and Trademark Office officially registered the slogan with International Falls on January 29, 2008, Registration Number 3375139. Only a few days after announcing its success in the trademark battle, International Falls had a daily record low temperature of −40 °F (−40 °C), beating a previous record of −37 °F (−38.3 °C) in 1967.

Demographics

As of 2000 the median income for a household in the city was $29,908, and the median income for a family was $41,458. Males had a median income of $41,584 versus $20,053 for females. The per capita income for the city was $19,171. About 10.0% of families and 14.5% of the population were below the poverty line, including 20.5% of those under age 18 and 12.3% of those age 65 or over.

2010 census
As of the census of 2010, there were 6,424 people, 2,903 households, and 1,645 families residing in the city. The racial makeup of the city was 93.3% White, 1.0% African American, 2.5% Native American, 0.2% Asian, 0.1% from other races, and 2.8% from two or more races. Hispanic or Latino of any race were 1.1% of the population.

There were 2,903 households, of which 26.6% had children under the age of 18 living with them, 39.1% were married couples living together, 12.1% had a female householder with no husband present, 5.5% had a male householder with no wife present, and 43.3% were non-families. 37.4% of all households were made up of individuals, and 16.4% had someone living alone who was 65 years of age or older. The average household size was 2.16 and the average family size was 2.80.

The median age in the city was 42.4 years. 21.9% of residents were under the age of 18; 8.6% were between the ages of 18 and 24; 22.4% were from 25 to 44; 27.3% were from 45 to 64; and 19.8% were 65 years of age or older. The gender makeup of the city was 48.1% male and 51.9% female.

2000 census
As of the census of 2000, there were 6,703 people, 2,959 households, and 1,751 families residing in the city. The racial makeup of the city was 95.3% White, 0.3% African American, 2.6% Native American, 0.2% Asian, 0.2% from other races, and 1.5% from two or more races. Hispanic or Latino of any race were 0.7% of the population.

There were 2,959 households, of which 27.6% had children under the age of 18 living with them, 44% were married couples living together, 11.4% had a female householder with no husband present and 40.8% were non-families. 36.5% of all households were made up of individuals, and 18.2% had someone living alone who was 65 years of age or older. The average household size was 2.20 and the average family size was 2.85.

The median age in the city was 40.5 years. 23.3% of residents were under the age of 18; 5.1% were between the ages of 20 and 24; 25.5% were from 25 to 44; 22.3% were from 45 to 64; and 20.7% were 65 years of age or older. The gender makeup of the city was 47.7% male and 52.3% female.

Politics

Local media

FM

The local Icebox Radio Theater produces radio drama broadcasts on 106.9 FM, with a power output of one watt.

AM

Television

Local cable television service is offered by Midcontinent Communications.

Newspaper
The local newspaper was The Journal which closed in June, 2021.

Culture
Icebox Radio Theater

The Backus Community Center opened in 2002 and serves as one of the cultural centers of International Falls. Each year, the Backus Performing Arts Series presents a number of musical and stage productions to the local community.

The Borealis Bards community theatre group has staged a number of productions since its founding in 2014, including 2015's production of Alice In Wonderland.

The International Falls post office contains a mural, Early Lodging in Koochichin Falls, painted by Lucia Wiley. Federally commissioned murals were produced from 1934 to 1943 in the United States through the Section of Painting and Sculpture, later called the Section of Fine Arts, of the Treasury Department. The WPA was the largest and most ambitious American New Deal agency, employing individuals to carry out public works projects.

Transportation
Falls International Airport (IATA code: INL, ICAO code: KINL) is a public airport located just south of the city. The airport has two runways. It is mostly used for general aviation but is also served by a single commercial airline, Delta Air Lines' Delta Connection, which has two daily flights to Minneapolis–Saint Paul International Airport.

The Minnesota, Dakota and Western Railway operates a  line between International Falls and Ranier.

Major highways
The following routes are located within the city of International Falls.
  U.S. Highway 53
  U.S. Highway 71
  Minnesota State Highway 11

Port Code : 3604

References in popular culture
A Sears Diehard car battery commercial was filmed in International Falls in the 1970s, playing on the city's extremely cold winter climate to promote the longevity and effectiveness of the product. It led to a parody ad – aired several times in the first (1975) season of Saturday Night Live – promoting a geriatric product.

The fictional Minnesota small town of Frostbite Falls, which was the hometown of cartoon characters Rocket "Rocky" J. Squirrel and Bullwinkle J. Moose of The Rocky and Bullwinkle Show, was a spoof of the real-life International Falls. The fictional town was located in Koochiching County as well.

The 2019 dark comedy film, International Falls (starring Rachael Harris, Rob Heubel and Matthew Glave), is set and filmed in International Falls.

Notable people
Edward Backus, industrialist
Tammy Bakker, PTL The 700 Club
Dean Blais, hockey coach, University of Nebraska, Omaha, NCHC
Bill Borcher, University of Oregon head basketball coach 1951–1956
Keith Christiansen, hockey player, United States Hockey Hall of Fame, silver medalist and co-captain of 1972 USA Team in Winter Olympics Sapporo, Japan
Kevin Constantine, hockey coach, NHL, IHL
Jim Crotty, pro football player, Washington Redskins
Mike Curran, hockey player, United States Hockey Hall of Fame, 1972 Winter Olympics silver medal
Richard Dougherty, Minnesota Gopher Hall of Fame hockey, silver medal 1956 Olympic Games
Constance Edith Fowler, artist, printmaker, author, educator
Arlys Johnson-Maxwell, weightlifter Senior World Champion 1987
Bob Mason, Goalie NHL 1984–1991, goaltending coach of Minnesota Wild
Jack McDonald, ice hockey goaltender for Michigan
Bronko Nagurski, football player, member of the College Football Hall of Fame and the Pro Football Hall of Fame
Bronko Nagurski Jr., football player for Notre Dame and in Canadian Football League
Bob Neuenschwander, Minnesota state legislator and businessman
Ernest Oberholtzer, explorer, author, conservationist
Gary Sampson, hockey player, Washington Capitals
Neil Sheehy, hockey player, Calgary Flames Hartford Whalers and Washington Capitals NHL Hockey Agent
Timothy Sheehy, hockey player, United States Hockey Hall of Fame, silver medalist and co-captain of 1972 USA Team in Winter Olympics Sapporo, Japan
Frank Youso, NFL player, New York Giants, Oakland Raiders

See also
 Voyageurs National Park

Notes

References

External links

City of International Falls
International Falls Convention and Visitors Bureau

 
Cities in Minnesota
Cities in Koochiching County, Minnesota
County seats in Minnesota
1901 establishments in Minnesota